Proctor is an unincorporated community and census-designated place (CDP) in Comanche County, Texas, United States. According to the Handbook of Texas, the community had an estimated population of 220 in 2000.

It is situated along U.S. Highway 377 in eastern Comanche County, approximately twelve miles northeast of Comanche.

Thomas O. Moore established the community in 1872. The settlement was moved to its present site in the early 1890s to be on the route of the Fort Worth and Rio Grande Railroad. Briefly known as Camden, the name was soon changed to Proctor. During the early 20th century, Proctor flourished, but began to decline by the 1930s. The community is now home to around 220 residents.

Although Proctor is unincorporated, it has a post office, with the ZIP code 76468. Public education in the community is provided by the Comanche Independent School District.

Climate
The climate in this area is characterized by relatively high temperatures and evenly distributed precipitation throughout the year.  The Köppen Climate System describes the weather as humid subtropical, and uses the abbreviation Cfa.

References

External links

Unincorporated communities in Comanche County, Texas
Unincorporated communities in Texas
Census-designated places in Comanche County, Texas
Census-designated places in Texas